Bechstein's bat (Myotis bechsteinii) is a species of vesper bat found in Europe and western Asia, living in extensive areas of woodland.

Description

Bechstein's bat is a medium-sized and relatively long-eared bat. The adult has a long, fluffy fur which is reddish-brown above and gray-white below. It has a pinkish face, and its ears are long and broad. The wings are dark brown and rather broad, with the membrane attached to the base of the feet. Its wingspan measures up to 30 cm (11.8 in.) and it has a head-to-body length of 5 cm (1.9 in)

Habits
Bechstein's bat feeds chiefly on flying prey such as moths, dipterans, neuropterans and other small nocturnal insects. Analysis of droppings from the Isle of Wight and Wiltshire shows a diet consisting of dung flies, grasshoppers, nut weevils, and moths. Populations cut off from forest land are recorded to shift to a diet of terrestrial insects and spiders caught from the ground. Bechstein's bats typically forage within one or two kilometers of their roost, and hunt primarily in the forest canopy.

Tree holes, typically woodpecker holes, are used for roosting. Bechstein's bat is also recorded to enter artificial nest boxes, but rarely roosts in human buildings. Over the winter, Bechstein's bats hibernate underground and in tree holes. Mating happens in autumn and spring, and delayed fertilization means that young (one per female) are born early in the following summer. Maternity colonies typically form late in the spring.

Range
Bechstein's bat can be found in the following countries: Austria, Armenia, Azerbaijan, Belarus, Belgium, Bosnia and Herzegovina, Bulgaria, Croatia, Czech Republic, Denmark, France, Georgia, Germany, Hungary, Iran, Italy, Liechtenstein, Moldova, Montenegro, Netherlands, North Macedonia, Poland, Portugal, Romania, Russian Federation, Serbia, Slovakia, Slovenia, Spain, Sweden, Switzerland, Turkey, Ukraine, United Kingdom and Iran.

In the United Kingdom, Bechstein's bat occurs chiefly in southeastern Great Britain, which consists of the northernmost extent of its range. Although, according to the map on the right it occurs in Southern Sweden. It is found in the Forest of Dean and Herefordshire. In 2009 a detailed study by The Bat Conservation Trust of 10 counties took place to determine the range of the Bechstein's bat and in 2010 a lactating female Bechstein's was discovered in Grafton Wood, an Ancient Wood originally part of the Forest of Feckenham and jointly owned by the Worcestershire Wildlife Trust and Butterfly Conservation, suggesting that there was a breeding colony in the wood or close by. The following year Bechstein's were again found at Grafton Wood and also at Trench Wood, also in Worcestershire . The  People's Trust for Endangered Species are funding further research work at Grafton Wood. A single male was caught and recorded near Colby in Southern Pembrokeshire.

Habitat

Bechstein's bat is specialized for inhabiting forested areas, and is rarely found outside of them. It is recorded in mixed forests in southwestern Asia, but European populations prefer deciduous forests with high proportions of old trees. Beech and oak woodlands make up a large portion of the animal's habitat. Bechstein's bats are occasionally also found in orchards, gardens and other cultivated areas.

Protection
Bechstein's bat is protected under the European Habitats Directive.

In the UK it is one of the region's rarest and most endangered species. It estimated that 21,600 individuals exist in the whole region, the true population size is difficult to estimate and three potential error sources have been identified in this estimate as such a range of 10,300 and 55,600 individuals is provided. Woodlands containing it may be considered for notification as a Site of Special Scientific Interest and may attract a grant under Natural Englands Environmental Stewardship scheme. On the rare chance one is spotted in the wild, authorities suggest immediately reporting it to a local batgroup or the wildlife trust.

Echolocation
The frequencies used by this bat species for echolocation lie between 35 and 108 kHz. Its echolocation calls have the most energy at 61 kHz, and have an average duration of 3.3 ms. Most of its echolocation is in the 50–60 kHz range.

See also
 Hambach Forest

References

External links
Woodland Management For Bats Guide 

 Bechstein's bat (Science For Nature Foundation)

Mouse-eared bats
Bats of Asia
Bats of Europe
Near threatened animals
Near threatened biota of Asia
Taxonomy articles created by Polbot
Mammals described in 1817